Chandra Prakash Gharti (born 30 July 1981), commonly known as CP Gharti is a Nepalese politician. He is the current Mayor of Bheri municipality in Jajarkot. He is a youth leader of Nepal Communist Party.

See also 
 List of Nepalese politicians

References

External links

 Official website of Bheri municipality
 

1981 births
Living people
People from Jajarkot District
Communist Party of Nepal (Unified Marxist–Leninist) politicians
Nepal Communist Party (NCP) politicians